Virginia de los Ángeles Lovo Chávez (born 23 July 1992) is a Nicaraguan footballer who plays as a forward for the Nicaragua women's national team.

Club career
Lovo has played for Saúl Álvarez in Nicaragua.

International career
Lovo capped for Nicaragua at senior level during the 2010 CONCACAF Women's World Cup Qualifying qualification, two Central American and Caribbean Games editions (2010 and 2014) and the 2012 CONCACAF Women's Olympic Qualifying Tournament qualification.

References 

1992 births
Living people
Nicaraguan women's footballers
Women's association football forwards
Nicaragua women's international footballers